The UK Antarctic Place-Names Committee (or UK-APC) is a United Kingdom government committee, part of the Foreign and Commonwealth Office, responsible for recommending names of geographical locations within the British Antarctic Territory (BAT) and the South Georgia and the South Sandwich Islands (SGSSI). Such names are formally approved by the Commissioners of the BAT and SGSSI respectively, and published in the BAT Gazetteer and the SGSSI Gazetteer maintained by the Committee. The BAT names are also published in the international Composite Gazetteer of Antarctica maintained by SCAR.

The Committee may also consider proposals for new place names for geographical features in areas of Antarctica outside BAT and SGSSI, which are referred to other Antarctic place-naming authorities, or decided by the Committee itself if situated in the unclaimed sector of Antarctica.

Names attributed by the committee

 Anvil Crag, named for descriptive features
Anckorn Nunataks, named after J. F. Anckorn
 Bachstrom Point, named after Johann Bachstrom, author
 Baldred Rock, originally named Bass Rock and renamed in 1954 after Saint Baldred
 Bamber Glacier, named after  Jonathan Bamber
 Barrett Buttress, named after Richard G. Barrett, surveyor
 Basilisk Crag, named for descriptive features
 Bergel Rock, named after Alexandra Bergel
 Bernard Rocks, named after Claude Bernard, French physiologist
 Berntsen Ridge, named after Captain Søren Berntsen
 Binary Peaks, originally named Doppelspitz; the new name was recommended in 1971
 Blechnum Peaks, named after the rare fern Blechnum penna-marina, native to the region.
 Blyth Spur, named John Blyth, cook
 Bone Glacier, named after Douglas Bone
 Bonner Beach, named after Nigel Bonner zoologist and Antarctic mammal specialist. Breeding ground for Weddell seals.
 Bordal Rock, named after Harald Bordal, gunner
 Boreas Peak, named after Boreas
 Bothy Bay, named for descriptive features
 Boutan Rocks, named after Louis Marie-Auguste Boutan (1859–1934), French naturalist
 Boyer Rocks, named after Joseph Boyer, French naval officer
 Breccia Crags, named after geographic features
 Bremner Glacier, named after Steven Bremner
 Buddington Peak, named after James W. Buddington
 Burns Bluff, named after Frederick M. Burns, geophysicist
 Burton Cove, named after Robert W. Burton, British Antarctic Survey assistant
 Buzfuz Rock, named after Sergeant Buzfuz, a character in Charles Dickens' The Pickwick Papers
 Cabrial Rock, named after Frank Cabrial, steward
 Camana Rock, named after the Camana sailing vessel
 Canis Heights, named after the constellations of Canis Major and Canis Minor
 Canso Rocks, named after the Canso aircraft
 Capella Rocks, named after the star Capella
 Cape Fothergill, named after Alastair Fothergill
 Cape Zumberge, named after its association with James Zumberge
 Capstan Rocks, named after its resemblance to a capstan
 Catcher Icefall, named for its association with the whaling industry
 Cetacea Rocks, named after the zoological order Cetacea
 Catodon Rocks, named after the sperm whale, Physeter catodon
 Cauldron Pool, named after geographical features
 Chance Rock, named after geographical features
 Chapman Hump, named in conjunction with Chapman Glacier
 Chisel Peak, named for descriptive features
 Copestake Peak, named after Paul Goodall-Copestake, biological assistant
 Corelli Horn, named after Arcangelo Corelli, Italian composer
 Cornice Channel, named for geographical features
 Cornwall Peaks, originally named Cornwall Peak (singular); name changed in 1954
 Corr Dome, named for Hugh Corr
 Cruchley Ice Piedmont, renamed in 1987
 Cuthbertson Snowfield, named after William Cuthbertson, artist
 Davies Heights, named after Robert E.S. Davies, geologist
 Davies Top, named after Anthony G. Davies, medical officer
 Dikstra Buttresses, named after Barry James Dikstra, geophysicist
 Diver Point, named for geographic features
 Dixey Rock, named after David J. Dixey
 Dixon Peak, named after Lieutenant John B. Dixon, Royal Navy
 Donnachie Cliff, named after Thomas Donnachie, radio operator
 Downham Peak, named after Noel Y. Downham, meteorological assistant
 Dreadnought Point, named for descriptive features
 Dudeney Nunataks, named for John Dudeney
 Duparc Rocks, named after Louis Duparc, French naval officer
 Elliott Rock, named after Henry W. Elliott, American naturalist
 Ewer Pass, named after John R. Ewer, meteorological observer
 Fang Buttress, named for descriptive features
 Fantome Rock
 Farman Highland, named after Joseph C. Farman, atmospheric physicist
 The Fid, named for descriptive features
 Fielding Col, named after Harold M. Fielding, surveyor
 Finback Massif, named after the finback whale
 Fishhook Ridge, named for descriptive features
 Flatcap Point, named for descriptive features
 Fleet Point, named after Michael Fleet
 Flett Buttress, named after William R. Flett, geologist
 Förster Cliffs, named after Reinhard Förster, West German geologist
 Foxtail Peak, named for geographic features
 Francis Peak, named for Jane Francis
 Freberg Rocks, named after Hjalmar Freberg, gunner
 Fricker Ice Piedmont, named after Helen Amanda Fricker
 Fringe Rocks, named for geographical location
 Frost Rocks, named after Richard Frost, survey assistant
 Fulmar Bay, named after the Fulmarus glacialoides that nest in the area
 Fulmar Crags
 Gaudin Point, named after Marc Antoine Gaudin, French photographer
 Gazella Peak, named after the Arctocephalus gazella
 Geelan Ice Piedmont, named after Patrick John Michael Geelan
 Gemel Peaks, originally named Twin Peaks and renamed in 1960
 Gerber Peak, named after Friedrich Gerber, Swiss veterinary surgeon
 Gervaize Rocks, named after Charles Gervaize, French naval officer
 Giles Bay, named after Katherine Giles
 Glass Point, named after R.H. Glass
 Gordon Nunataks, named after Arnold L. Gordon, American oceanographer
 Grinder Rock, named for descriptive features
 Hauron Peak, named for French cinematographer Louis Arthur Ducos du Hauron
 Haller Rocks, named after Albrecht von Haller, Swiss physiologist
 Hamer Hill, named after Richard D. Hamer, geologist
 Hampton Bluffs, named after Ian F.G. Hampton, physiologist
 Hardy Rocks, named after James D. Hardy, American physiologist
 Haverly Peak, named after William R. Haverly
 Headland Peak, named after Robert K. Headland, biological assistant
 Hektor Icefall, named for the Hektor Whaling Company
 Henriksen Buttress, named after Henrik N. Henriksen
 Heywood Glacier, named after Karen Heywood
 Highton Glacier, named after John E. Highton
 Hindley Glacier, named after Christopher Hindley
 Hindmarsh Dome, named after Richard Hindmarsh
 Hobbs Point, named after Graham J. Hobbs, geologist
 Homing Head, named for descriptive features
 Hornpipe Heights, named in conjunction with Whistle Pass
 Hoskins Peak, named after Arthur K. Hoskins, geologist
 Hospital Point, originally called Rocky Point and renamed in 1961
 Hübl Peak, named after Artur Freiherr von Hübl, Austrian surveyor
 Huddle Rocks, named for descriptive features
 Humpback Rocks, originally named Knolrokset and renamed in 1954
 Humphries Heights, named after Colonel G.J. Humphries
 Hurst Bay, named after Commander William E. Hurst, Royal Navy
 Husdal, named for the Husvik whaling station
 Hyatt Cove, named after Raymond H. Hyatt
 Hydrurga Rocks, named after Hydrurga leptonyx, the leopard seal
 Jardine Peak, named after D. Jardine, geologist
 Jeffries Bluff, named after Margaret Elsa Jeffries
 Jeffries Peak, named after John Jeffries, American physician
 Kerr Point, named after Adam J. Kerr
 Killermet Cove
 King Glacier, named after John King
 King Dome, named after Edward King
 Kinzl Crests, named after Hans Kinzl, Austrian glaciologist
 Kjellstrøm Rock, named after Johan Kjellstrøm, gunner
 Knuckle Reef, named for geographical features
 Kramer Rocks, named after J.G.H. Kramer, an Austrian army physician
 Kuno Point, named after Yasau Kuno, a Japanese physiologist
 Ladkin Glacier, named for Russell Scott Ladkin
 Landing Cove, named for descriptive features
 Larssen Peak, named after Harald Larssen, manager
 Lawrence Channel, named after Captain Stuart J. Lawrence
 Laxon Bay, named after Seymour Laxon
 Lomas Ridge, named after Simon Andrew Lomas, geologist
 Lorn Rocks, named for descriptive features
 Lyell Lake, named in conjunction with Lyell Glacier, South Georgia
 Mackworth Rock, named after Norman H. Mackworth, British experimental psychologist
 Marker Rock, named for geographical features
 McCollum Peak, named after Elmer V. McCollum, American biochemist
 Menelaus Ridge, named for Menelaus, husband of Helen
 The Menhir, named for geographic features
 Miller Heights, named after Ronald Miller
 Molley Corner, named after William Molley
 Molnar Rocks, named after George W. Molnar, American physiologist
 Morris Glacier, named after Elizabeth M. Morris
 Morton Cliff, named after British Antarctic Survey field assistant Ashley Morton
 Mount Antell, named after Georg Antell
 Mount Back, named after Anthony H. Back
 Mount Berry, named after "Captain" Albert Berry, American parachutist
 Mount Cortés, named after Martín Cortés de Albacar, Spanish author
 Mount Cox, named after Nicholas Cox 
 Mount Dow, named after George F. Dow, American whaling historian
 Mount Eastman, named after George Eastman, American entrepreneur
 Mount Fagerli, named after Soren Fagerli
 Mount Fiennes, named after Lady Virginia (Ginny) Twistleton-Fiennes
 Mount Goldring, named after Denis C. Goldring, geologist
 Mount Gunter, named after  Edmund Gunter, English mathematician
 Mount Markab, named after the Markab star
 Mudge Passage, named after Thomas Mudge, horologist
 Mulvaney Promontory, named after Robert Mulvaney
 Nodule Nunatak, named for descriptive features
 Northtrap Rocks, named for location
 Olsen Rock, named after Soren Olsen, gunner
 Pinnock Nunataks, named after  Michael Pinnock
 Platt Cliffs, named after Eric Platt
 Pollux Nunatak, named for its association with Castor Nunatak
 Pudsey Bay, named after Carol Pudsey
 Rodger Nunataks, named after Alan Rodger
 Ronne Ice Shelf, named for its association with Edith Ronne
 Scud Rock, named for geographic features
 Shanklin Glacier, named after Jonathan Shanklin
 Southtrap Rock, named for geographic features
 Stark Rock, named for descriptive features
 Taylor Buttresses, named after Brian J. Taylor
 Turner Inlet, named after John Turner
 Tolly Nunatak, named after Guðfinna 'Tollý' Aðalgeirsdóttir
 Vertigo Cliffs, named for descriptive features
 Vogel Peak, named after Dr. P. Vogel

See also
 SCAR Composite Gazetteer of Antarctica
 Australian Antarctic Names and Medals Committee

References

External links
 UK-APC website
 SCAR Composite Gazetteer of Antarctica

United Kingdom and the Antarctic
Names of places in Antarctica
Foreign, Commonwealth and Development Office
Antarctic agencies
Geographical naming agencies